Ourisia is a genus of flowering plants of the family Plantaginaceae, native to western South America or New Zealand.

Species
Species assigned to Ourisia include: 
Ourisia alpina
Ourisia biflora
Ourisia breviflora
Ourisia chamaedrifolia
Ourisia cotapatensis
Ourisia coccinea
Ourisia crosbyi
Ourisia fragrans
Ourisia fuegiana
Ourisia macrophylla
Ourisia melaspermioides
Ourisia microphylla
Ourisia muscosa
Ourisia polyantha
Ourisia pulchella
Ourisia pygmaea
Ourisia ruellioides
Ourisia serpyllifolia

References

 
Plantaginaceae genera